Möre is one of the original small lands of Småland, a historical province (landskap) in southern Sweden. It corresponds to the south-eastern part of modern Kalmar County. Möre was divided into two hundreds: Möre Northern Hundred and Möre Southern Hundred.

Möre is mentioned c. 900, by Wulfstan of Hedeby as Meore:

The mention is viewed as evidence that Möre was a well-known region. Traditionally, it has also been interpreted as evidence of 9th-century rule from the Mälaren Valley, but some modern historians instead opine that Sweons was a general term for peoples north of Denmark and did not imply centralised Swedish rule.

From the late 13th century and onwards, Möre was responsible for supporting Kalmar Castle. Legally, it was part of the jurisdiction of Östergötland, until 1559, when it was transferred to the newly formed jurisdiction of Småland.

Nils Dacke, main leader of the peasant side in the Dacke War against king Gustav Vasa, was born in Vissefjärda parish in Möre Southern Hundred around 1510. Dacke's initial rebellion sprung up in Möre and spread fast due to heavy taxation, forced Lutheran reformation of the church, royal seizures of church property and restrictions on trade with the then Danish Skåneland; it was eventually defeated by the king's army. Today, Nils Dacke is celebrated locally as a freedom fighter and a symbol of regionalism.

In 1645, Möre Southern Hundred was given as a fief to Axel Oxenstierna.

References

Småland
Geography of Kalmar County